North Dublin may refer to:

Geography
 Northside, Dublin, the part of Dublin city north of the River Liffey
 Fingal, the north part of County Dublin

Parliamentary constituencies
 North Dublin (UK Parliament constituency), 1885 to 1922
 Dublin City North (Dáil constituency), 1923 to 1937
 Dublin North (Dáil constituency), 1981 to 2016